Lars Nilsson may refer to:

 Lasse Nilsson (born 1982), Swedish footballer
 Lars Nilsson (designer) (born 1966), Swedish fashion designer
 Lars Nilsson (shaman) (fl. 1691–1693), Sami shaman
 Lars Nilsson (volleyball) (born 1965), Swedish volleyball player

See also
 Lars Fredrik Nilson (1840–1899), Swedish chemist